Luma Costa (July 5, 1988 in Rio de Janeiro) is a Brazilian actress.

Biography 
In addition to participation in programs of Rede Globo and Carga Pesada and Sítio do Picapau Amarelo, Luma became known as Márcia Anita of Começar de Novo.

In 2006, Luma began her graduation in Journalism. The course was locked up in 2007 to devote her best for her acting career, in the same year she won a prominent role on the TV Record telenovela, Luz do Sol.

In 2009, she made her first novel as an adult, Poder Paralelo, Lauro César Muniz, in which she played Bebel, a girl who seduces older men and is very selfish.

After five years in Rede Record, Luma returned in 2011 to Rede Globo soap opera in Fina Estampa, the role of the mysterious Surfer Nanda.

Personal life 
In June 2012, Luma married businessman Leonardo Martins.

On October 28, 2013, she confirmed that she was pregnant with her first child, the result of her marriage to Leonardo Martins. Luma gave birth to Antônio on June 12, 2014, around 12:30 in the maternity ward Perinatal, in Rio de Janeiro, cesarean section, with 3.320 kg and 48.5 cm.

Career

TV

Theater

Cinema

References

External links 

1988 births
Living people
Actresses from Rio de Janeiro (city)
Brazilian stage actresses
Brazilian telenovela actresses
21st-century Brazilian actresses